Limnonectes ingeri (common names: Inger's wart frog, greater swamp frog) is a species of frog in the family Dicroglossidae.
It is found in Borneo (Brunei, Indonesia, and Malaysia).
Its natural habitats are tropical moist lowland forests, rivers, and swamps.
It is probably seriously affected by habitat loss, and locally also by collection for food.

References

ingeri
Fauna of Brunei
Amphibians of Indonesia
Amphibians of Malaysia
Endemic fauna of Borneo
Taxonomy articles created by Polbot
Amphibians described in 1978
Amphibians of Borneo